Pudo is a town in Sissala East Municipal District, Upper West Region in northern Ghana near the border with Burkina Faso.

Mining 
Historically, the Pudo area has been a significant source of ironware.

Pudo is near significant unexploited iron ore deposits.

See also 
 Iron ore in Africa

References 

Populated places in Sissala East Municipal District